Easy Living is a 1986 studio album by Ella Fitzgerald, accompanied by guitarist Joe Pass. Fitzgerald was nominated for the Grammy Award for Best Jazz Vocal Performance, Female at the 30th Annual Grammy Awards for her performance on this album.

This was the fourth and final album in Fitzgerald's series of duets with Pass, the three earlier albums being Take Love Easy (1973), Fitzgerald and Pass... Again (1976) and Speak Love (1983).

Reception

In his AllMusic review, critic Scott Yanow wrote that "her voice was visibly fading, although her charm and sense of swing were still very much present. But this CD is not one of her more significant recordings, other than being one of the final chapters."

Track listing
"My Ship" (Kurt Weill, Ira Gershwin) – 4:26
"Don't Be That Way" (Benny Goodman, Mitchell Parish, Edgar Sampson) – 3:00
"My Man" (Maurice Yvain, Jacques Charles, Albert Willemetz, Channing Pollock) – 3:28
"Don't Worry 'Bout Me" (Rube Bloom, Ted Koehler) – 2:46
"Days of Wine and Roses" (Henry Mancini, Johnny Mercer) – 3:04
"Easy Living" (Ralph Rainger, Leo Robin) – 4:14
"I Don't Stand a Ghost of a Chance with You" (Victor Young, Bing Crosby, Ned Washington) – 6:02
"Love for Sale" (Cole Porter) – 4:38
"Moonlight in Vermont" (Karl Suessdorf, John Blackburn) – 4:20
"On Green Dolphin Street" (Bronislau Kaper, Ned Washington) – 3:25
"Why Don't You Do Right?" (Kansas Joe McCoy) – 2:56
"By Myself (1937 song)" (Arthur Schwartz, Howard Dietz) – 3:26
"I Want a Little Girl" (Murray Mencher, Billy Moll) – 2:46
"I'm Making Believe" (Mack Gordon, James V. Monaco) – 2:38
"On a Slow Boat to China" (Frank Loesser) – 5:05

Personnel
 Ella Fitzgerald - vocals
 Joe Pass - guitar

References

1986 albums
Albums produced by Norman Granz
Collaborative albums
Ella Fitzgerald albums
Joe Pass albums
Pablo Records albums
Vocal–instrumental duet albums